The 119th Rifle Division was an infantry division of the Red Army, formed three times.

It was originally raised at Krasnoyarsk in 1939 as a motor rifle division until the following year when it was reorganized as a standard Red Army rifle division, and served for the duration of the Great Patriotic War in that role. It saw very limited service in the Winter War against Finland. Following the German invasion in 1941 the first two formations of the division distinguished themselves on the battlefield, and were raised to the status of Guards Rifle divisions: the 17th Guards following the Battle of Moscow; and the 54th Guards for its successes in Operation Uranus. The division was formed for a third time in early 1943 and served for the duration of the war in the north-central sectors of the front, taking part in the offensive that drove the Nazi forces out of the Baltic States and winning a decoration for the liberation of Riga. The division was moved to the Odessa Military District soon after the end of the war, and was disbanded in the next few months.

1st Formation 
The division was organized at Krasnoyarsk in the Siberian Military District in 1939 as a motor rifle division, as part of the pre-war expansion of the Red Army. It was moved to the Finnish front from January to March 1940, but only its artillery took part in the fighting. After returning to the Siberian Military District it was reorganized as a regular rifle division in April. As of June 22, 1941, it comprised:
 365th Rifle Regiment
 421st Rifle Regiment
 634th Rifle Regiment
 349th Light Artillery Regiment
 224th Sapper Battalion
 143rd Reconnaissance Company
Maj. Gen. Aleksandr Dmitrievich Berezin commanded the division through the existence of this formation. Following the onset of Barbarossa the division was rushed to the front, being assigned to 24th Army and then 31st Army in Reserve Front in August 1941. Unlike the newer divisions being formed at that time, the 119th had the pre-war organization and as of September 20 was actually over strength, with 1,142 officers, 14,804 NCOs and men, 13 tankettes, 4 armored cars, 166 heavy machine guns, 408 light machine guns, 54 45mm antitank guns, 85 artillery pieces, 109 mortars and 4 antiaircraft guns.

With the launch of the German Operation Typhoon, the division was involved in heavy fighting west of Rzhev in the first week of October. On October 6 the 365th Rifle Regiment was transferred to the 18th Rifle Division, which had escaped from encirclement with significant casualties. In exchange the 119th received the 920th Rifle Regiment from the 247th Rifle Division, a unit made up from a cadre of NKVD troops. At about this time the division was transferred to 29th Army, in Kalinin Front, and after the battle for Kalinin, back to 31st Army. By late November, even after this heavy fighting, the division still had a strength of 7,200 men, higher than average for Kalinin and Western Fronts at this time.

The men and women of the division fought well during the rest of the Battle of Moscow, and in the following counteroffensive. Beginning on January 8, 1942, 31st Army took part in the Sychevka-Vyasma Offensive Operation, which was planned "to encircle, and then capture or destroy the enemy's entire Mozhaisk - Gzhatsk - Vyasma grouping", that is, what later became known as the Rzhev salient. The 119th was one of the spearheads of this thrust behind the German lines, reaching the area near Bely by mid-January. The division was recognized for its achievements in this counteroffensive on March 17 when it became the 17th Guards Rifle Division.

2nd Formation 
A new 119th Rifle Division was formed on April 21, 1942, in the Kalinin Oblast of the Moscow Military District, based on the 51st Rifle Brigade.

51st Rifle Brigade
This brigade began forming in October 1941, from military students and training units in the Volga Military District. It was moved west in December and was assigned to the reserves of Northwestern Front. It was then moved to the 4th Shock Army, and it was one of the second echelon units of that army when the Toropets-Kholm Offensive began on January 9, 1942. Through the rest of the winter the brigade fought in 4th Shock, deep in the Toropets salient behind the German-held Rzhev salient, until it was pulled out in April and sent back to Kalinin.

1942 Campaign
The new division's order of battle remained the same as that of the first formation, except the 349th was now a standard divisional artillery regiment. Col. Ivan Yakovlevich Kulagin was appointed to command on the day the division formed. The 51st Brigade was a well-experienced unit so the new division needed only about three months to form up and train. It remained in the Moscow defenses until July when it was moved south to join 3rd Tank Army in the Reserve of the Supreme High Command. On August 30, still in reserve, it was reassigned to 5th Tank Army, fighting in Bryansk Front during the autumn.

During October, the 5th Tank Army was moved to Southwestern Front, under the command of Lt. Gen. N. F. Vatutin. At this time the 119th was noted as having 50 percent Russian personnel, with the remaining half being primarily Ukrainian and Asian. On November 19, the opening day of Operation Uranus, the division was deep within the Red Army's Serafimovich bridgehead across the Don River, at the village of Kalmykovskii, facing the Romanian 14th Infantry Division. At 0730 hrs., 3,500 guns, mortars and rocket launchers opened an 80-minute preparation along the penetration sectors of Southwestern and Don Fronts. Before this was completed, forward elements of the 119th, supported by sappers, pushed to within 200 - 300 metres of the forward edge of the Romanian defenses. Before the artillery was finished, the infantry assault began.

Operation Uranus
Together the four rifle divisions in the bridgehead were backed by 138 tanks. On the 119th's left the 50th Guards and its supporting armor tore a gaping hole in the defenses on the left flank of Romanian 5th Infantry Division by 1100 hrs.; this leveraged the 119th's thrust due south, with all three rifle regiments in the first echelon, smashing the enemy's first defensive positions and approaching the village of Blinovskii by the same hour. This was an advance of 2-3km, less than anticipated in the offensive plan. By noon the division had helped to crack open the lines held by Romanian II Army Corps sufficiently to create an opening for the armor of 5th Tank to exploit. 1st Tank Corps deployed its three tank brigades in a line and at 1400 hrs. began advancing through the 119th and the adjacent 154th Rifle Division, (which was re-designated as the 47th Guards Rifle Division the next day.) in an attack that obliterated the remaining defenses of the Romanian 14th Infantry; the surviving Romanian troops caught "tank fright" and were routed. Later in the afternoon, the 634th Rifle Regiment cooperated with roughly 45 vehicles of 26th Tank Corps' 157th Tank Brigade to destroy the Romanian 14th's remaining strongpoint at Klinovoi, after which the armor continued to advance up to 22km against light resistance. The remainder of the division made slower progress.

On November 20, Colonel Kulagin left command of the division; he would take command of the 35th Guards Rifle Division a few weeks later. He was replaced the following day by Col. Mikhail Matveevich Danilov, who had been the commander of the 437th Rifle Regiment of 154th Rifle Division, and would hold command for the duration of this formation. During the day most of the 119th continued to support the 157th Tank Brigade to overcome or bypass Romanian strongpoints and other obstacles, with the goal of reaching the towns of Zhirkovskii and Perelazovskii deep in the enemy rear, while the 365th Rifle Regiment, along with the 50th Guards and supporting armor, fought to contain Romanian forces being encircled east of the Tsaritsa River. The 365th seized Hill 208.0, then pushed on eastward with the tanks to the west bank of the river by midday, beginning the process of encircling the 1st Romanian Armored Division and other Romanian forces to the east. The Romanian tanks attempted to break out southwest to link up with German XXXXVIII Panzer Corps, but were unsuccessful, and lost 25 vehicles in the process.

The following day, Colonel Danilov "castled" his regiments southwards along the Tsaritsa, then attacked eastwards against the remnants of the Romanian armor, advancing up to 5km. The goal was to link up with the 277th Rifle Division of 21st Army and complete the encirclement of the remaining eastern forces of Romanian Third Army, now known as Group Lascar. At 2000 hrs. the leading elements of the two rifle divisions joined hands west of Verkhne-Cherenskii, completing the first major encirclement of Axis forces in Operation Uranus. Early on November 22 the division joined with the 50th Guards, 216th Tank Brigade, and one regiment of the 346th Rifle Division to attack Group Lascar's defenses along and east of the Tsaritsa. The division attacked eastward and northeastward, captured Korotkovskii, and then got into a fight to capture Zhirkovskii against strong resistance. At this point the 1st Romanian Armored made an attempt to break out of the pocket, with roughly 20 R-2 tanks and 220 trucks and other vehicles. This force pushed through the 119th's defenses, after which it fought a running battle with Soviet cavalry and tanks to the rear. The division's forces ignored the breakout as best they could, before lunging with the 50th Guards east towards the town of Golovskii, 10km to the east, which was the headquarters of Group Lascar. While the Romanian group made plans to break out, in defiance of orders from the German high command, the two Soviet divisions engaged the Romanian 6th Infantry Division in a running fight that lasted from 1600 to 2100 hrs., while Group Lascar was also being severely pressed by 21st Army. Golovskii fell to 50th Guards at 2100 hrs., completely disrupting the Romanian command.

November 23 saw the rifle forces of 5th Tank Army attempting to destroy the encircled Romanian group. The 119th captured the Romanian strongpoint at Zhirkovskii early in the morning, then dispatched one of its rifle regiments southward to intercept a Romanian column from escaping, while the remaining regiments drove eastwards into the center of the shrinking pocket. These captured Verkhne-Cherenskii at 1400 hrs. and linked up with the 333rd Rifle Division of 21st Army. At the same time, the left-flank regiment joined hands with that Army's 96th and 63rd Rifle Divisions, further sub-dividing the pocket. Overnight many Romanians were taken prisoner, including General Lascar. It fell to Brig. Gen. Trajan Stanescu, Lascar's deputy, to seek a formal surrender of Third Army, which went into effect at 0230 hrs. on November 24. The remaining Romanians surrendered over the next 12 hours, a total of 27,000 officers and men, including 5,000 from the escaping column intercepted by the regiment of the 119th and other Soviet forces. Following this, the division got a brief rest while it prepared to exploit to the Oblivskaya area on the Chir River.

Battle for Surovikino
On November 25 the 119th was tasked with the liberation of Surovikino, relieving 1st Tank Corps, and then with a drive across the lower Chir. This town proved a tough nut to crack, and the German defenders were still holding out in the evening of November 27, when the division was joined by the 333rd Rifle. 24 hours later Surovikino continued to hold out. On the morning of the 30th the division penetrated into the town's northern outskirts, where it entered into street fighting with the defenders of composite Group Schmidt, while the 333rd carved out a bridgehead over the Chir to the east. The fighting for Surovikino continued through the first three days of December, while 5th Tank Army prepared for a new offensive towards Tormosin, based from the 333rd's bridgehead. The goal of the offensive was to disrupt any German offensive from the lower Chir to relieve their forces surrounded at Stalingrad; the 119th's goal was to complete the liberation of Surovikino and then to attack across the river with two regiments, along with two regiments of the 321st Rifle Division. When the offensive began on December 9, the advance battalions of the two divisions encountered intense small arms and artillery fire from a very mixed group of Axis forces that forced them to go to ground. The full offensive was then postponed to the next day.

The sporadic fighting for Surovikino continued over the next several days. Finally, owing to the expansion of Soviet bridgeheads over the Chir to the east and west, despite the efforts of 11th Panzer Division to throw them back, the German position in the town became untenable, and it was evacuated overnight on December 14–15, with the 119th taking possession. As a result of this success and those earlier in the campaign, the division was one of the first of the Stalingrad divisions raised to Guards status, becoming the 54th Guards Rifle Division on December 16.

3rd Formation 
The final 119th Rifle Division began forming at Aleksin in the Moscow Military District, based on the 161st Rifle Brigade, in March 1943.

161st Rifle Brigade
This rifle brigade was formed in February - March 1942 in the Moscow Military District. It was immediately assigned to the Moscow Defence Zone. In April it was moved to the 11th Army in Northwestern Front, on the north flank of the Soviet forces besieging the Demyansk Pocket. It was moved to 34th Army during this battle, and was there when the German forces evacuated in February 1943. Following this, the brigade became part of the 12th Guards Rifle Corps in the 27th Army in the area of Staraya Russa. In April the brigade was moved back to the Moscow Military District for rebuilding.

Into Belarus and the Baltic States
The division completed forming on April 19, when it was assigned to 3rd Reserve Army in the Reserve of the Supreme High Command. The order of battle remained the same as that of the second formation. It was under the command of Col. Ivan Dmitrievich Panov, but he was replaced on July 27 by Maj. Gen. Iosif Ivanovich Khorun. The division was assigned to 21st Army in Western Front before the Smolensk Offensive Operation in August, and two months later reassigned to 60th Rifle Corps in Kalinin Front reserves. Shortly thereafter this Front was renamed 1st Baltic, and the division and its corps became part of 4th Shock Army.

4th Shock began a new offensive on November 2 in the directions of Polotsk and Vitebsk. 60th Corps, supported by the 143rd Tank Brigade, struck the defenses of the 87th Infantry Division and the much-depleted 2nd Luftwaffe Field Division on a 10km-wide front centered 16km south of Nevel. By November 6 the Corps had penetrated the enemy defenses to a depth of about 10km, at which point the 2nd Guards Rifle Corps was committed into the sector from the second echelon, with the mission "to widen the mouth to the south and destroy the defending enemy". Once a breakthrough was achieved, 4th Shock regrouped its forces to exploit; the 119th and the 357th Rifle Divisions were sent southwestwards towards Polotsk. Third Panzer Army's IX Army Corps scrambled to assemble several small combat groups to block the advance in this direction. By November 20 the division was on both sides of the Nevel - Polotsk railway in the area near Dretun, just 26km short of its objective, brought to a halt by an unexpected thaw and the resistance of German Group von Gottberg and the 211th Infantry Division. Due to the extended front held by 4th Shock, 60th Corps held these general positions into the new year.

In February 1944, the 119th was moved to 83rd Rifle Corps, where it remained for the duration of the war. Apart from a short reassignment to 1st Shock Army in March, the division was in 4th Shock Army until January 1945. At the start of the Soviet summer offensive the division was facing the German Panther Line defenses on the Drissa River, north of Polotsk. On July 18, following the breakthrough of these defenses and the exploitation to the west, General Khorun handed command of the division to Col. Ivan Mikhailovich Toropchin. By the beginning of August 4 Shock had reached the eastern outskirts of Daugavpils in Latvia. The advance continued until by mid-September it had arrived in the area of Biržai in northern Lithuania. The 119th's final change of command took place on October 18, when Colonel Toropchin was replaced by Col. Mikhail Lavrentevich Dudarenko. On October 22, the division was awarded the Order of Suvorov, 2nd Class, for its services in the liberation of Riga. In the new year the division and its corps were shifted to 42nd Army in 2nd Baltic Front, then to 10th Guards Army on the coast of the Baltic in March, guarding the cut-off German forces in the Courland Pocket. In mid-April the 83rd Corps went into the Reserve of the Supreme High Command in the 22nd Army, ending the war out of the front lines.

It appears the entire 83rd Rifle Corps, including the 119th Rifle Division, was disbanded in the Odessa Military District in 1945-46.

References

Citations

Bibliography

External links
Aleksandr Dmitrievich Berezin
Ivan Yakovlevich Kulagin
Mikhail Matveevich Danilov
Iosif Ivanovich Khorun

119
Military units and formations established in 1939
Military units and formations disestablished in 1946